Charles Max Mason (–), better known as Max Mason, was an American mathematician.  Mason was president of the University of Chicago (1925–1928) and president of the Rockefeller Foundation (1929–1936).

Mason's mathematical research interests included differential equations, the calculus of variations, and electromagnetic theory.

Education
B.Litt., 1898, University of Wisconsin-Madison
Ph.D., Mathematics, University of Göttingen, 1903.
Dissertation: "Randwertaufgaben bei gewöhnlichen Differentialgleichungen" (Boundary value functions with ordinary differential equations)
Advisor: Hilbert

Career
 Massachusetts Institute of Technology (MIT), 1903–1904, Instructor of Mathematics.
 Yale University, 1904–1908, Assistant Professor of Mathematics.
 University of Wisconsin–Madison, 1908–1909, University of Wisconsin–Madison, Associate Professor of Mathematics.
 University of Wisconsin–Madison, 1909–1925, Professor of Physics.
National Research Council, 1917–1919, Submarine Committee. (Invented a submarine detection device, which was the basis for sonar detectors used in World War II.)
 University of Chicago, 1925–1928, President.
 Rockefeller Foundation, 1928–1929, Director, Natural Sciences Division.
 Rockefeller Foundation, 1929–1936, President.
 Palomar Observatory (California), 1936–1949, Chairman of the team directing the construction of the observatory.

On , he appeared on Edgar Bergen's radio show to chat about the new observatory and trade jokes with Charlie McCarthy. In 1948, he, along with Lee A. DuBridge, William A. Fowler, Linus Pauling, and Bruce H. Sage, was awarded the Medal for Merit by President Harry S. Truman.

Notes and references

External links

1877 births
1961 deaths
20th-century American mathematicians
Mathematical analysts
Mathematics educators
Medal for Merit recipients
Members of the United States National Academy of Sciences
People from Madison, Wisconsin
Presidents of the Rockefeller Foundation
Presidents of the University of Chicago
University of Chicago faculty
University of WisconsinMadison alumni
University of Wisconsin–Madison faculty
Yale University faculty